Frederick Aspinall (2 September 1859 – date of death unknown) was an English first-class cricketer. Aspinall's batting style is unknown. He was born at West Kirby, Cheshire.

A club cricketer for Birkenhead Park Cricket Club, Aspinall made a single first-class appearance for a combined Liverpool and District team against Yorkshire in 1892 at Aigburth Cricket Ground, Liverpool. In a match which Liverpool and District won by 6 wickets, Aspinall made scores of 16 in their first-innings, before he was dismissed by Louis Hall, while in their second-innings he ended the innings not out on 11.

References

External links
Frederick Aspinall at ESPNcricinfo
Frederick Aspinall at CricketArchive

1859 births
People from West Kirby
English cricketers
Liverpool and District cricketers
Year of death missing